UP: Unified Praise is a live praise and worship album of Praise & worship by the Australian Hillsong Church and English band Delirious?. The album reached No. 24 on the Top Christian Albums Chart.

Making of the album 

UP: Unified Praise was recorded live at the Sydney SuperDome by Darlene Zschech and the Hillsong Team with special guests Delirious? at the Hillsong Conference 2003, at which there were over 20,000 people.

Track listing

Note: The album was released as an audio-only release and as a concert video. The lengths listed are from the CD version. "King of Majesty" was 4:15 on the DVD.

 "Everyday" (Joel Houston) – 5:20
 "Free" (Marty Sampson) – 4:07
 "I Give You My Heart" (Reuben Morgan) – 8:08
 "More Than Life" (Morgan) – 9:08
 "Worthy Is the Lamb" (Darlene Zschech) – 6:17
 "I Could Sing of Your Love Forever"/"God's Romance" (Martin Smith) – 8:13
 "King of Majesty" (Sampson) – 4:10
 "Did You Feel the Mountains Tremble" (Smith) – 9:56
 "My Glorious" (Smith, Stu Garrard) – 7:07
 "Rain Down" (Smith, Garrard) – 6:23
 "Majesty (Here I Am)" (Garrard, Smith) – 6:09
 "What a Friend I've Found" (Smith) – 5:26
 "History Maker" (Smith) – 10:06

Featured musicians 

 Marcus Beaumont – electric guitar
 Michael Guy Chislett – electric guitar
 Mitch Farmer – drums
 Ian Fisher – bass guitar
 Rolf Wam Fjell – drums
 Brandon Gillies – drums
 Nigel Hendroff – electric guitar
 Luke Holmes – electric guitar
 Luke Munns – drums
 Albert Sampson – electric guitar
 Nathan Taylor – electric guitar
 Matt Tennikoff – bass guitar

References 

Delirious? albums
2004 live albums
2004 video albums
Live video albums
Collaborative albums
Hillsong Music live albums
Hillsong Music video albums